Sucker may refer to:

General use
 Lollipop or sucker, a type of confection
 Sucker (slang), a slang term for a very gullible person
 Hard candy
 Cough drop
 Mint (candy)

Biology
 Sucker (botany), a term for a shoot that arises underground from the roots of a tree or shrub
 Sucker (zoology), various adhesive organs
 Suckerfish (disambiguation)

In arts and entertainment

Film and television
Suckers, an animated television series by Spanish animation studio BRB Internacional
 The Suckers, a 1972 sexploitation film directed by Stu Segall
 Suckers (film), a 1999 comedy-drama film directed by Roger Nygard
 Sucker, a 2011 horror film produced by Kimberley Kates
 "Suckers", a 2003 episode of the fourth season of CSI: Crime Scene Investigation

Books
 Suckers: How alternative medicine makes fools of us all, a 2008 book about alternative medicine written by Rose Shapiro

Music
 Suckers (band), a Brooklyn-based band
 Sucker (album), a 2014 album and its title track by Charli XCX 
 "Sucker" (song), a 2019 song by the Jonas Brothers
 "Sucker", a 1994 song by Baboon from Face Down in Turpentine
 "Sucker", a 1973 song by The J.B.'s from Doing It to Death
 "Sucker", a 1972 song by Mott the Hoople from All the Young Dudes
 "Sucker", a 2000 song by New Found Glory from New Found Glory
 "Sucker", a 2000 song by Peaches from The Teaches of Peaches
 "Suckers!", a 2007 song by Super Furry Animals from Hey Venus!'

See also 
 Sücka
 Sucker Lake (disambiguation)
 Suckermouth
 Sucker punch (disambiguation)
 Sucker River
 Sucker State, unofficial nickname for Illinois
 Suction cup
 No Sucker, a 2020 song by Lil Baby and Moneybagg